The 2009–10 Primera División season was the 119th season of top-flight professional football in Argentina. A total of 20 teams competed in the season, which started on 21 August 2009 and ended on 23 May 2010.

Changes from 2008–09
The major changes for this season apply to international qualification. For the 2010 Copa Libertadores, an aggregate table of the two tournaments held in 2009 (2009 Clausura and 2009 Apertura) will be taken into account, instead of an average of the past three tournaments. For the 2010 Copa Sudamericana, River Plate and Boca Juniors will no longer be invited without merit. Their open berths will be up for qualification to any team, including themselves.

On 21 August, the Argentine Football Association revoked the television broadcasting contract with TyC in the hopes of increasing revenue to help the financially struggling clubs. On 18 August, the AFA and the Government of Argentina struck a deal to broadcast the season for free on non-cable channels, which allowed the season to start on the 21st.

Club information

Twenty clubs will participate in the 2009–10 season, with eighteen sides remaining from the previous season. Gimnasia y Esgrima de Jujuy and San Martín de Tucumán were relegated at the end of the 2008–09 season. They were replaced by Chacarita Juniors and Atlético Tucumán, both of whom were promoted from the Primera B Nacional. Rosario Central and Gimnasia y Esgrima (LP) played the relegation/promotion playoffs against Belgrano and Atlético de Rafaela, respectively. Both Gimnasia y Esgrima and Rosario Central won their playoff matches and retained their status in top-flight football.

1.Chacarita Juniors played all their home games on Argentinos Juniors' Diego Armando Maradona stadium.
2.Estudiantes' own stadium is undergoing renovation and the team is playing in Quilmes.
3.The first match Independiente played in Estadio Libertadores de América after reconstruction was on 28 October 2009. Prior to that, Independiente used Estadio Ciudad de Lanús.
4.Newell's Old Boys changed the name of their stadium to Estadio Marcelo Bielsa from Estadio Newell's Old Boys on 22 December 2009.

Managerial changes

Transfers

Torneo Apertura
The Torneo Apertura was scheduled to begin on 14 August 2009 and end on 13 December 2009. However, the AFA delayed the start of the tournament until 21 August 2009 due to financial debts in some clubs.

Standings

Results

Top ten goalscorers

Source:

Torneo Clausura

Standings

Results

Top ten goalscorers

Source:

Relegation

Source:

Relegation/promotion playoffs

|-
!colspan="5"|Relegation/promotion playoff 1

|-
!colspan="5"|Relegation/promotion playoff 2

All Boys won 4–1 and was promoted for the next season to Primera División, while Rosario Central was relegated to the Primera B Nacional. Gimnasia y Esgrima (LP) won 3–2 and stayed in the Primera División.

International qualification

Copa Libertadores
The first two of Argentina's five allocated berths to the 2010 Copa Libertadores went to the 2009 Clausura champion (Vélez Sársfield) and the 2009 Apertura champion (Banfield). The remaining three berths went to the teams with the best average of the past two tournaments. Additionally, Estudiantes had a berth as the defending Copa Libertadores champion.

Copa Sudamericana
Qualification for the 2010 Copa Sudamericana is determined by an aggregate table of the Apertura 2009 and Clausura 2010 tournaments. The top six teams in the aggregate table qualify. Boca Juniors and River Plate will no longer be invited to the tournament without merit.

See also
2009–10 in Argentine football

References

External links
Season regulations 
Universofutbol.com Clausura 2010 

1
Argentine Primera División seasons